Alpha 1 is a science fiction anthology edited by Robert Silverberg first published in 1970.

Stories in Alpha 1
Introduction by Robert Silverberg
Poor Little Warrior by Brian W. Aldiss
The Moon Moth by Jack Vance
Testament of Andros by James Blish
A Triptych by Barry N. Malzberg
For a Breath I Tarry by Roger Zelazny
Game for Motel Room by Fritz Leiber
Thus We Frustrate Charlemagne by R. A. Lafferty
The Man Who Came Early by Poul Anderson
The Time of His Life by Larry Eisenberg
The Doctor by Ted Thomas
Time Trap by Charles L. Harness
The Pi Man by Alfred Bester
The Last Man Left in the Bar by C. M. Kornbluth
The Terminal Beach by J. G. Ballard

References
 Goodreads listing for Alpha 1
 MIT Science Fiction Society's Library Pinkdex Entry for Alpha 1

1970 anthologies
Science fiction anthologies
Robert Silverberg anthologies
Ballantine Books books